Agdzhakala or Aghjaghala may refer to:
 Nerkin Bazmaberd, Armenia
 Tsaghkalanj, Armenia